The 1995 DieHard 500 was the 18th stock car race of the 1995 NASCAR Winston Cup Series and the 27th iteration of the event. The race was held on Sunday, July 23, 1995, in Lincoln, Alabama, at Talladega Superspeedway, a  permanent triangle-shaped superspeedway. The race took the scheduled 188 laps to complete. At race's end, Morgan–McClure Motorsports driver Sterling Marlin would manage to dominate the late stages of the race to take his fourth career NASCAR Winston Cup Series victory and his third and final victory of the season. To fill out the top three, Robert Yates Racing driver Dale Jarrett and Richard Childress Racing driver Dale Earnhardt would finish second and third, respectively.

On lap 139 of the race, a 13-car pileup started when Hendrick Motorsports driver Jeff Gordon tapped the left rear of teammate Ken Schrader, sending Schrader airborne. Schrader proceeded to flip numerous times end over end. In the carnage, 12 other cars suffered damage. Schrader suffered a bruised right eye in the wreck.

Background 

Talladega Superspeedway, originally known as Alabama International Motor Superspeedway (AIMS), is a motorsports complex located north of Talladega, Alabama. It is located on the former Anniston Air Force Base in the small city of Lincoln. The track is a tri-oval and was constructed in the 1960s by the International Speedway Corporation, a business controlled by the France family. Talladega is most known for its steep banking and the unique location of the start/finish line that's located just past the exit to pit road. The track currently hosts the NASCAR series such as the NASCAR Cup Series, Xfinity Series and the Camping World Truck Series. Talladega is the longest NASCAR oval, a  tri-oval like the Daytona International Speedway, which also is a  tri-oval.

Entry list 

 (R) denotes rookie driver.

Qualifying 
Qualifying was split into two rounds. The first round was held on Friday, July 21, at 4:00 PM EST. Each driver would have one lap to set a time. During the first round, the top 20 drivers in the round would be guaranteed a starting spot in the race. If a driver was not able to guarantee a spot in the first round, they had the option to scrub their time from the first round and try and run a faster lap time in a second round qualifying run, held on Saturday, July 22, at 11:45 AM EST. As with the first round, each driver would have one lap to set a time. For this specific race, positions 21-38 would be decided on time, and depending on who needed it, a select amount of positions were given to cars who had not otherwise qualified but were high enough in owner's points; which was usually four. If needed, a past champion who did not qualify on either time or provisionals could use a champion's provisional, adding one more spot to the field.

Three drivers would fail to qualify.

Full qualifying results

Race results

References 

1995 NASCAR Winston Cup Series
NASCAR races at Talladega Superspeedway
July 1995 sports events in the United States
1995 in sports in Alabama